Chris Coletta (born July 29, 1972) is an American former cyclist. He competed in the team pursuit at the 1992 Summer Olympics.  He graduated from University of Illinois and Harvard University.

References

External links
 
CYCLIST WHO NEARLY QUIT MAKES TEAM

1972 births
Living people
American male cyclists
Olympic cyclists of the United States
Cyclists at the 1992 Summer Olympics
Sportspeople from Maywood, Illinois
American track cyclists
University of Illinois Urbana-Champaign alumni
Harvard University alumni
Pan American Games medalists in cycling
Pan American Games silver medalists for the United States
Medalists at the 1991 Pan American Games